The Communitarian Party of Romania (PCDR) is a political party in Romania. The leader of the party is Petre Ignatencu. Though not openly communist, the party unofficially claims to be the successor of the Romanian Communist Party, often using its symbology during party actions. The party claims that the Socialist Alliance Party (now the Romanian Socialist Party), another organisation claiming the legacy of the Communist Party, is a pseudo-communist party.

History
On 19 March 2010, the Committee for the Reorganization of the Romanian Communist Party was formed. The committee proclaimed the founding of the New Romanian Communist Party (NPCR, officially PCR). The congress of the committee elected the taxi driver Petre Ignatescu as president of the new party. In 2012, NPCR officials submitted a request to register the Communist Party. On 21 February 2013, in a press conference, the communist leaders announced that the Bucharest Tribunal rejected the request to register PCR as a political party, but they said that will not stop the process for the official recognition of the party. The party was ultimately registered in 2015 using the current name, after dropping all reference to communism from party documents.

President

References

External links
Website of the Committee for the Reorganisation of the Romanian Communist Party
Romanian Communist Party Youtube

2015 establishments in Romania
Communitarianism
Communist parties in Romania
Left-wing parties in Romania
Progressive parties
Political parties established in 2015
Registered political parties in Romania